Mahmud Ibrahim Abunada (born 5 February 2000) is a Qatari footballer who plays as a goalkeeper for Qatari club Al-Arabi.

Career
Abunada started his career at Al-Arabi and is a product of the Al-Arabi youth system. On 14 February 2019, he made his professional debut for Al-Arabi against Al-Rayyan in the Pro League.

References

2000 births
Living people
Qatari footballers
Association football goalkeepers
Al-Arabi SC (Qatar) players
Qatar Stars League players